The 1994–95 Bulgarian Cup was the 55th season of the Bulgarian Cup. Lokomotiv Sofia won the competition, beating Botev Plovdiv 4–2 in the final at the Vasil Levski National Stadium in Sofia.

First round

|-
!colspan=5 style="background-color:#D0F0C0;" |23 November / 7 December 1994

|}

Second round

|-
!colspan=5 style="background-color:#D0F0C0;" |15 February / 8 March 1995

|-
!colspan=5 style="background-color:#D0F0C0;" |17, 18 February / 8 March 1995

|-
!colspan=5 style="background-color:#D0F0C0;" |22 February / 8 March 1995

|-
!colspan=5 style="background-color:#D0F0C0;" |1 / 8 March 1995

|}

Quarter-finals

|-
!colspan=5 style="background-color:#D0F0C0;" |5 April / 3 May 1995

|}

Semi-finals

|-
!colspan=5 style="background-color:#D0F0C0;" |10 / 17 May 1995

|}

Final

Details

References

1994-95
1994–95 domestic association football cups
Cup